Pat McCarran, or Patrick A. McCarran, is a bronze sculpture depicting the United States Senator from Nevada of the same name by Yolande Jacobson, installed in the United States Capitol's Hall of Columns, in Washington, D.C., as part of the National Statuary Hall Collection. The statue was donated by the U.S. state of Nevada in 1960.

References

External links

 

1960 establishments in Washington, D.C.
Bronze sculptures in Washington, D.C.
McCarran
Sculptures of men in Washington, D.C.